Bouba Sacko was a Malian contemporary guitarist.

Biography
When Sacko started playing guitar in the 1960s, the concept of "artist guitarist" barely existed. Only griot artists must sing, dance or play guitariste in Mali. He wasn't a griot, but he changed this rule. He was one of the first nobles to play guitar.  The famed praise musicians of West Africa's Mande people mostly worked with the Kora (21-string harp), Ngoni (spike lute) and wooden-slatted Balafon. Bouba's father, Ibrahim Sacko, was the director of the state-sponsored Instrumental Ensemble of Mali, so the traditional repertoire and lore of Mande griot heritage surrounded him from the start. Either way, Sacko stuck with the guitar, developing a powerful capacity to evoke traditional instruments using his axe. He died on December 26, 2011.

References

External links
The Official Blog of Afropop Worldwide: Remembering Bouba Sacko

2011 deaths
Year of birth missing